"Advice to Little Girls" is a humorous essay written by Mark Twain in 1865 and published in 1867.

External links

 

1867 short stories
Short stories by Mark Twain